Gaziosmanpaşa may refer to:

 Gazi Osman Pasha (1832–1900), Ottoman military commander
 Gaziosmanpaşa, a district of Istanbul, Turkey
 Gaziosmanpaşaspor, a sports club from the district
 Gaziosmanpaşa Anadolu Lisesi, a high school in the district
 Gaziosmanpaşa, Çankaya, a suburb of Ankara, Turkey
 Gaziosmanpaşa University, a public university in Tokat, Turkey
 Gaziosmanpaşa Stadium, a multi-use stadium in Tokat, Turkey

See also
 Osman Nuri Pasha (disambiguation)